Elizabeth Balogun is a Nigerian basketball player. She plays college basketball for the Louisville Cardinals Women's Team and the Nigerian national team.

High school
Balogun moved to Hamilton Heights High School, Tennessee in the eighth grade from Lagos, Nigeria. She averaged 15.1 points, 4.6 rebounds, 2.7 blocks and 2.1 assists. She made the ALL-USA Girls Basketball First Team at the end of High school.

College career
Balogun started as a freshman at Georgia Tech in 2018, She left the team for Louisville Cardinals after being named the 2018-19 ACC freshman of the year having averaged 14.64 points per game in her freshman season.
In her sophomore year at Louisville, she was named preseason All-ACC by Coaches and Blue Ribbon Panel and was also named into the Citizen Naismith Watch List.

Nigerian National Women's Basketball team
Balogun was called up to represent the D'Tigress and to participate in the 2019 pre-Olympic Qualifying tournament in Mozambique, but she was not released by Louisville. She was also called up to participate in the Tokyo 2020 Olympic Qualifiers in Belgrade.

Personal life
Balogun is the second of 3 children, her older brother, Ezekiel, played at The Citadel in South Carolina. Her younger sister, Ruth, played at Hamilton Heights and plays at University of Central Arkansas. Her mom Justina died of breast cancer before Balogun moved to America, while her dad, Mark, resides in Nigeria, where he is basketball coach and a policeman.

References

2000 births
Living people
Basketball players at the 2020 Summer Olympics
Louisville Cardinals women's basketball players
Nigerian expatriate basketball people in the United States
Nigerian women's basketball players
Olympic basketball players of Nigeria